The Linux Unified Key Setup (LUKS) is a disk encryption specification created by Clemens Fruhwirth in 2004 and was originally intended for Linux.

While most disk encryption software implements different, incompatible, and undocumented formats, LUKS implements a platform-independent standard on-disk format for use in various tools. This not only facilitates compatibility and interoperability among different programs, but also assures that they all implement password management in a secure and documented manner.

Description 

LUKS is used to encrypt a block device. The contents of the encrypted device are arbitrary, and therefore any filesystem can be encrypted, including swap partitions. There is an unencrypted header at the beginning of an encrypted volume, which allows up to 8 (LUKS1) or 32 (LUKS2) encryption keys to be stored along with encryption parameters such as cipher type and key size.

The presence of this header is a major difference between LUKS and plain dm-crypt, since the header allows multiple different passphrases to be used, with the ability to change and remove them with ease. However, if the header is lost or corrupted, the device will no longer be decryptable.

Encryption is done with a multi-layer approach. First, the block device is encrypted using multiple master keys, each of which is encrypted with an active user key in each keyslot. While keyslots often contain a passphrase, other kinds of keys include OpenPGP public keys or X.509 certificates. PGP public keys can be used in combination with an OpenPGP smart card which is inserted into the host. This layered scheme is known as TKS1.

There are two versions of LUKS, with LUKS2 having features such as resilience to header corruption, and using the Argon2 encryption algorithm by default, whereas LUKS1 uses PBKDF2. Conversion between both versions of LUKS is possible in certain situations, but some features may not be available with LUKS1 such as Argon2. LUKS2 uses JSON as a metadata format.

Available cryptographic algorithms depends on individual kernel support of the host. Libgcrypt can be used as a backend for hashing, which supports all of its algorithms. It is up to the operating system vendor to choose the default algorithm. LUKS1 makes use of an anti-forensics technique called AFsplitter, allowing for secure data erasure and protection.

Using LUKS with LVM 

Logical Volume Management can be used alongside LUKS.

 LVM on LUKS  When LVM is used on an unlocked LUKS container, all underlying partitions (which are LVM logical volumes) can be encrypted with a single key. This is akin to splitting a LUKS container into multiple partitions. The LVM structure is not visible until the disk is decrypted.
 LUKS on LVM  When LUKS is used to encrypt LVM logical volumes, an encrypted volume can span multiple devices. The underlying LVM volume group is visible without decrypting the encrypted volumes.

Full disk encryption 

A common usage of LUKS is to provide full disk encryption, which involves encrypting the root partition of an operating system installation, which protects the operating system files from being tampered with or read by unauthorized parties.

On a Linux system, the boot partition (/boot) may be encrypted if the bootloader itself supports LUKS (e.g. GRUB). This is undertaken to prevent tampering of the Linux kernel. However, the first stage bootloader or an EFI system partition cannot be encrypted (see Full disk encryption#The boot key problem).

On mobile Linux systems, postmarketOS has developed osk-sdl to allow a full disk encrypted system to be unlocked using a touch screen.

Encrypted home directories 

On systems running systemd, the systemd-homed component can be used to encrypt individual home directories.

Operating system support 

The reference implementation for LUKS operates on Linux and is based on an enhanced version of cryptsetup, using dm-crypt as the disk encryption backend. Under Microsoft Windows, LUKS-encrypted disks can be used via the Windows Subsystem for Linux. (Formerly, this was possible with LibreCrypt, which currently has fundamental security holes, and which succeeded FreeOTFE, formerly DoxBox.)

DragonFly BSD supports LUKS.

Installer support 

Several Linux distributions allow the root device to be encrypted upon OS installation. These installers include Calamares, Ubiquity, Debian-Installer, and more.

On-disk format 

LUKS headers are forward compatible; newer versions of LUKS should be able to read headers of previous versions.

LUKS1

LUKS2 

LUKS2 devices begin with a binary header intended to allow recognition and fast detection by blkid, which also contains information such as checksums. All strings used in a LUKS2 header are null-terminated strings. Directly after the binary header comes the JSON area, containing the objects config (configuration), keyslots, digests, segments (describes encrypted areas on the disk), and tokens containing extra metadata.

The binary format for regular luks2 keyslots are mostly similar to their predecessor, with the addition of different per-keyslot algorithms. Another type of key exists to allow redundancy in the case that a re-encryption process is interrupted.

Examples 

Cryptsetup is the reference implementation of the LUKS frontend.

To encrypt a device with the path /dev/sda1:
# cryptsetup luksFormat /dev/sda1

To unlock an encrypted device, where name is the mapped device name:
# cryptsetup luksOpen /dev/sda1 name

Re-encrypting 

Re-encrypting a LUKS container can be done either with the cryptsetup tool itself, or with a legacy tool called cryptsetup-reencrypt. These tools can also be used to add encryption to an existing unencrypted filesystem, or remove encryption from a block device.

Both methods have similar syntax:

# cryptsetup reencrypt /dev/sda1

# cryptsetup-reencrypt /dev/sda1

See also 

 Comparison of disk encryption software

References

External links

Frequently Asked Questions (FAQ)
LibreCrypt: Implementation for Windows
LUKS1 Specification
LUKS2 Specification

Cryptographic software
Disk encryption
Linux security software

de:Dm-crypt#Erweiterung mit LUKS